The 2006–07 Liga II was the 67th season of the second tier of the Romanian football league system. The name of the leagues in Romania was changed started with this season. (Divizia A was renamed as Liga I, Divizia B as Liga II, Divizia C as Liga III, Divizia D as Liga IV).

The format has been changed from three series of 16 teams to two series, each of them consisting of 18 teams. The top two teams from each series were promoted at the end of the season to the Liga I, while the bottom four were relegated to the Liga III.

Team changes

To Liga II
Promoted from Divizia C
 Delta Tulcea
 FC Snagov
 Chimia Brazi
 Building Vânju Mare
 Oltchim Râmnicu Vâlcea**
 Auxerre Lugoj
 Baia Mare
 Politehnica II Timișoara**
 Prefab Modelu**

Relegated from Divizia A
 Sportul Studențesc București**
 FCM Bacău

From Liga II
Relegated to Liga III
 Gloria II Bistrița**
 Altay Medgidia**
 Astra Ploiești
 Callatis Mangalia
 Minerul Motru
 Olimpia Satu Mare
 Inter Gaz București
 Petrolul Moinești
 Rapid II București
 Laminorul Roman
 Juventus București
 UTA Arad**
 Portul Constanța
 Dinamo II București
 Unirea Sânnicolau Mare
 Midia Năvodari
 FC Sibiu
 Armătura Zalău

Promoted to Liga I
 Ceahlăul Piatra Neamț
 FC U Craiova
 Liberty Salonta**
 Unirea Urziceni

Note (**)
Oltchim Râmnicu Vâlcea refused to promote in the Liga II, due to financial reasons, instead of them Apulum Alba Iulia was spared from relegation.

Tractorul Brașov promoted to Liga II, but sold its place to Politehnica II Timișoara.

Politehnica II Iași promoted to Liga II, but sold its place to Prefab Modelu.

Sportul Studențesc București was relegated from Divizia A due to financial reasons, Pandurii Târgu Jiu was spared from relegation.

Gloria II Bistrița withdrew from Liga II before the start of the season, instead of them Unirea Dej was spared from relegation.

Altay Medgidia withdrew from Liga II before the start of the season, instead of them FCM Târgoviște was spared from relegation.

Liberty Salonta sold its Liga I place to UTA Arad, club that initially relegated to Liga III. As a result, UTA Arad played in the 2006–07 Liga I and Liberty Salonta in the 2006–07 Liga III. The two clubs basically changed their places.

Renamed teams
Precizia Săcele was renamed as FC Săcele.

Poiana Câmpina was renamed as FCM Câmpina.

Dacia Unirea Brăila was renamed as CF Brăila.

League tables

Seria I

Seria II

Top scorers 

14 goals
  Costin Curelea (Sportul Studențesc)

13 goals
  Raul Rusescu (Dunărea Giurgiu)
  Claudiu Boaru (Gaz Metan Mediaș)

10 goals
  Radu Sabo (Universitatea Cluj)

9 goals
  Viorel Ferfelea (Sportul Studențesc)

8 goals
  Claudiu Ionescu (Dacia Mioveni)

7 goals
  Lucian Itu (Minerul Lupeni)
  Kallé Soné (Câmpina)

5 goals
  Viorel Ion (Gloria Buzău)

3 goals
  Salih Jaber (Gloria Buzău)
  Ionuț Cazan (Apulum Alba Iulia)
  János Székely (Universitatea Cluj)

See also 
2006–07 Liga I
2006–07 Liga III
2006–07 Liga IV

References 

Liga II seasons
Rom
2006–07 in Romanian football